Mowbray railway station is a Metrorail station on the Southern Line, serving the suburb of Mowbray in Cape Town.

The station has three tracks, served by a side platform and an island platform; the station building is at ground level on the western side of the tracks. Adjacent to the station is a major bus station of the Golden Arrow Bus Services and a large minibus taxi rank; Mowbray is the western end of the Klipfontein Road transport corridor to the Cape Flats.

Notable places nearby
 University of Cape Town
 Cape Peninsula University of Technology Mowbray campus
 Mowbray Maternity Hospital

Railway stations in Cape Town
Metrorail Western Cape stations